This is a list of firsts in Finland.

Education and academia 
 First director of the first Finnish research institute in applied psychology: Ester Hjelt
 First Finnish-speaking teacher training college: University of Jyväskylä
 First state schools for females in Finland: Svenska fruntimmersskolan i Åbo (English: Swedish Women's School of Åbo) and Svenska fruntimmersskolan i Helsingfors (English: Swedish Women's School of Helsingfors) (1844)

First women 
 Dissertations
 First dissertation by a Finnish woman (chemistry, University of Zurich): Lydia Sesemann (1874)
 First dissertation by a Finnish woman in Finland (Doctor of Medicine and Surgery): Karolina Eskelin (1895)
 First female opponent at a dissertation (Faculty of Medicine): Elsa Ryti (1927)
 First dissertation by a Finnish woman in Physics: Eugenie Lisitzin (1938)
 First dissertation by a Finnish woman in Finnish language studies: Eeva Lindén (1942)
 First dissertation by a Finnish woman in Astronomy: Liisi Oterma (1955)
 First dissertation by a Finnish woman in Economics: Vieno Rajaoja (1958)
Doctors
 First female Doctor of Philosophy: Tekla Hultin (1896)
 First female Doctor of Agriculture: Synnöve von Hausen (1936)
 First female Doctor of Laws (Justice) in Finland: Inkeri Anttila (1946)
 First female Doctor of Theology: Eira Paunu (1952)
 First female Doctor in Social Sciences: Elina Haavio-Mannila (1958)
Professorships
 First female professor in Finland (Personal Extraordinary Professor, Åbo Akademi): Alma Söderhjelm (1927)
 First female professor of Medicine and holder of a permanent chair (Obstetrics and Gynaecology): Laimi Leidenius (1930)
 First female professor of Chemistry: Salli Eskola (1947)
 First female professor in Physical and Natural Sciences (assistant professor in Chemistry): Salli Eskola
 First female professor of Pedagogy: Inkeri Vikainen (1959)
 First female professor of Law in Finland: Inkeri Anttila (1961)
 First female professor of Sociology: Faina Jyrkilä (1964)
 First female professor of Philosophy in Finland and in Scandinavia: Raili Kauppi (1969)
 First female professor of Women's Studies: Päivi Setälä (1991)
 Members of the Finnish Society of Sciences and Letters (Founded 1838)
 First female member of the Math and Physics division: Eugenie Lisitzin (1960)
 Other
 First female academic in Finland: Sara Wacklin
 First female folklorist in Finland to complete a doctoral degree: Elsa Enäjärvi-Haavio
 First female in Finland to earn a doctorate in the field of philosophy: Raili Kauppi
 First female Licentiate of Medicine (without being officially enrolled at a University): Rosina Heikel (1878)
 First female Magister of Philosophy: Emma Irene Åström
 First female Minister of Justice in Finland: Inkeri Anttila
 First female Rector of a university (University of Jyväskylä): Aino Sallinen (1992)
 First female to attend a university in Finland: Maria Tschetschulin (1870)
 First female to defend a doctoral degree in Finland: Karolina Eskelin
 First female to practice medicine in Finland and within all the Nordic countries: Rosina Heikel
 First female to receive a Ph.D. degree in Astronomy in Finland: Liisi Oterma
 First female veterinary surgeon in Europe and Finland: Agnes Sjöberg
 First Finnish woman to be appointed docent at a university: Alma Söderhjelm
 First Finnish woman to complete a doctorate: Lydia Sesemann
 First Finnish woman to take the matriculation examination: Maria Tschetschulin
 First Finnish woman to teach: Alma Söderhjelm

Literature 
 First book in the world and Finland written solely in text messages: Viimeiset viestit (English: Last Messages) by Hannu Luntiala (2007)
 First female writer in Finland: Sara Wacklin
 First Finnish language encyclopedia: Tietosanakirja (1909-1922)
 First Finnish language grammar book published: 1649
 First novel published in Finnish: Seven Brothers (Finnish: Seitsemän veljestä) (1870)

Media

Film 
 First active feature film company: Lyyra-Filmi
 First Finnish computer-animated feature film: The Emperor's Secret (Finnish: Keisarin salaisuus) (2006)
 First Finnish feature film and first fictional film: The Moonshiners (Finnish: Salaviinanpolttajat) (1907)
 First full-length Finnish feature film: Sylvi
 First full-length sound film with song and talk: Say It in Finnish (1931)
 First Finnish film: Novelty from Helsinki: School youth at break (1904)
 First Finnish film company: Atelier Apollo (1906)
 First Finnish film distributed widely abroad: When Father Has Toothache (1923)
 First Finnish film released on Blu-ray: Ganes (2007)
 First Finnish film with a soundtrack: Dressed Like Adam and a Bit Like Eve Too (1931)
 First public screening: 1896

Other 
 First Finnish album to certify gold based on downloads and streams: AMK Dropout (2014)
 First Finnish publisher to sell manga: Sangatsu Manga (2003)
 First Finnish video included in MTV Nordic's daily video-rotation: U Drive Me Crazy

Military 
 First Finnish Air Force base established: Utti (1918)

Politics and government 
 First President: Kaarlo Juho Ståhlberg
 First National Progressive President: Kaarlo Juho Ståhlberg
 First Agrarian President: Lauri Kristian Relander
 First National Coalitionist President: Pehr Evind Svinhufvud
 First Social Democratic President: Mauno Koivisto
 First female President: Tarja Halonen
 First Prime Minister: Pehr Evind Svinhufvud
 First female Prime Minister: Anneli Jäätteenmäki
 First Finnish Black Member of Parliament: Jani Toivola
 First time the President had been solely elected by a popular vote: 1994
 First openly gay Member of Parliament: Oras Tynkkynen
 First female Members of Parliament elected in Finland and the world: 1907
 First President of the Supreme Court of Finland: August Nybergh, 1918

Science and technology 
 First class of locomotive manufactured within Finland: Finnish Steam Locomotive Class A5, 1874

Sports and related events 
 First Finn to play in a Stanley Cup final: Matti Hagman
 First Finnish basketball player to play in the National Basketball Association: Jarkko Ruutu
 First Finnish boxer to win an Olympic medal: Bruno Ahlberg
 First Finnish cross-country skier to win an Olympic gold medal: Veli Saarinen
 First Finnish Olympic gold medalist: Verner Weckman
 First Finnish player within the National Hockey League: Pentti Lund
 First Finnish player to play in the German Bundesliga: Juhani Peltonen
 First Finnish player to play in the Women's United Soccer Association: Anne Mäkinen
 First Finnish woman to reach Olympic finals in swimming: Eila Pyrhönen

Titles and awards 
 First Finnish Nobel Prize winner: Frans Eemil Sillanpää
 First Finnish Olympic gold medalist: Verner Weckman
 First time winning the group stage at the Bandy World Championship: 2011

Other 
 First Finnish "freedom fighter": Lalli
 First Finnish entry in the Eurovision Song Contest to be awarded with a maximum score since the start of the twelve-point tradition in 1975: Lapponia
 First Finnish professor of forest inventory: Werner Cajanus
 First homoerotic stamps produced in Finland and the world: 2014 Tom of Finland stamps
 First time participating in the Eurovision Song Contest: 1961
 First representative of Finland at the Eurovision Song Contest: Laila Kinnunen

See also 
 List of firsts in Sweden

References 

Finland
Firsts